Anton Kolig (1 July 1886 – 17 May 1950) was an Austrian expressionist painter.

Biography 
Anton Kolig was born in Neutitschein as the son of salon artist Ferdinant Kolig. He studied at the Vienna School of Arts and Crafts with Oscar Kokoschka in 1904–1907, then from 1907 he continued his studies at the Academy of Fine Arts in Vienna under the guidance of Heinrich Lefler and Alois Delug.

In 1911, the work presented by him at the exhibition attracted the attention of specialists who awarded Kolig a scholarship and organized a trip to France. After the outbreak of war, he returned to Austria.

During the First World War, starting in 1916, he was in military service, and worked as a military artist in Vienna.

Kolig was a teacher, a professor in Stuttgart from 1928 to 1943. In 1944, he was seriously injured as a result of Allied bombing in World War II. He spent the last years of his life  in Nötsch im Gailtal, where he died on 17 May 1950.

See also

 Facing the Modern: The Portrait in Vienna 1900

Further reading 
 Edwin Lachnit. "Kolig, Anton." In Grove Art Online. Oxford Art Online, (accessed January 9, 2012; subscription required).

External links 
 
 Entry for Anton Kolig on the Union List of Artist Names
 

Austrian Expressionist painters
20th-century Austrian painters
Austrian male painters
1886 births
1950 deaths
20th-century Austrian male artists